M275 may refer to:

M275 motorway, a short motorway in Hampshire, southern England
Mercedes-Benz M275 engine, an automobile engine
M275 truck, a US military vehicle